Saeko Hirota is a former international table tennis player from Japan.

Table tennis career
From 1967 to 1969, she won several medals in doubles, and team events in the World Table Tennis Championships and in the Asian Table Tennis Championships.

Her four World Championship medals included two gold medals in the doubles with Sachiko Morisawa and the team event at the 1967 World Table Tennis Championships.

See also
 List of table tennis players
 List of World Table Tennis Championships medalists

References

Japanese female table tennis players